The Toplica Uprising was a mass uprising against Bulgarian occupation force, that took place in Bulgarian occupied Serbia during the First World War. The rebels were motivated by grievances against the Bulgarian authorities for ordering conscription of local Serbs in the Bulgarian army, forced labour and the denationalisation policy imposed on the indigenous population. The revolt was supported by Serbian guerrilla fighters known as Chetniks.

The Toplica uprising lasted from 21 February to 25 March 1917, it was the only uprising in an occupied country during the entire First World War; it has been estimated that as many 20,000 Serbs died in the revolt and its aftermath.

Background 
In October 1915, Kingdom of Serbia, which had throughout fall 1914 managed to withstand and repel three Austro-Hungarian invasions, found itself under attack again. This time it was a joint Austro-Hungarian, German, and Bulgarian invasion from two directions that included Austro-Hungarian Third Army, German Eleventh Army, and Bulgarian First and Second armies. Outnumbered and outmatched, the Serbian Army was defeated by December 1915. However, rather than surrendering and capitulating, the Serbian military and political leaders decided on a long and arduous army retreat south towards Albania in hopes of reaching the Adriatic coast for evacuation and regrouping. As a result, the invading Central Powers forces occupied the entire territory of the Kingdom of Serbia. In the immediate division of spoils, Kingdom of Bulgaria got the area of Pomoravlje, which had been a target of Bulgarian nationalism.

Prelude 

The primary cause for the rebellion was the policies passed by the occupiers. Constant denationalization, including closing Serbian schools, prohibition of the Serbian language and traditions, and burning of books, and looting, requisition, internment, provoked the population. Romania entering the war in August 1916 awakened hope in the Serbian population of a breakthrough of the Salonika front, some arming themselves and taking to the forests. Kosta Vojinović began the organization of resistance, and in the summer of 1916 established a band in Leposavić, the core of the future Ibar–Kopaonik Detachment. At the end of September 1916, the Serbian High Command sent Kosta Pećanac, reserve infantry lieutenant and veteran Chetnik vojvoda, by airplane into Toplica. He was given the task to establish a secret resistance organization to be activated when the Allies and the Serbian Army break the Salonika front and arrive at Skoplje. The peak of Serbian discontent came with the Bulgarian announcement of conscription of local Serbs aged 18–50 for military service. Massive flights to the mountains from Bulgarian recruit commissions began. The first armed conflicts began on 20 February between fleeing conscripts and Bulgarian chases. Pećanac and Vojinović established headquarters on Mount Kopaonik. Guerrilla leaders met secretly near Leskovac on 21 February 1917 in order to vote  whether to launch an uprising or not, a decision for a general uprising was taken, however, according to historian Andrej Mitrović by the time they made their decision, the uprising was already under way.

Uprising 

The rebellion included the areas of Toplica, Jablanica, Jastrebac, eastern and central parts of Kopaonik. The rebels liberated Kuršumlija (27 February), Lebane (1 March), Prokuplje (3 March) and Blace (5 March). Having broke out in the Toplica region, the rebellion expanded into territories on the right bank of the West Morava (Vlasotince, Crna Trava, Vranje area), and in the West Morava valley, included the Sokobanja and Svrljig areas.

On March 12, the Bulgarian counter-attack started under the command of Alexander Protogerov involving IMRO forces led by Tane Nikolov. Bulgarian and Austro-Hungarian authorities worked together. IMRO commander and Bulgarian officer Todor Aleksandrov orchestrated the most violent actions committed by Bulgarian paramilitary. After several days of fighting, the Bulgarians entered Prokuplje on 14 March and the Austro-Hungarians entered Kuršumlija on 16 March. As of 25 March, the order there was fully restored. In the battles, several thousand people were killed, including civilians. In April 1917, Pećanac with his guerrillas, attacked a railway station. On May 15, Pećanac entered the old Bulgarian border and invaded Bosilegrad, which was burned. Then his band withdrew to Kosovo, controlled then by the Austro-Hungarians. The Allies opened a new front at Salonika in June but the Serbian Army was unable to break through the Bulgarian lines. After reemerging again for a short time, in September – October 1917 Pećanac again disappeared. In October 1917 the Austro-Hungarian command created entirely Albanian paramilitary detachments to capture the rest of the Serbian rebels into the mountains and in December 1917, Kosta Vojinović was killed.

Legacy 

The uprising is a notable event in the history of Serbia in World War I. It was the only rebellion in the territories occupied by the armies of the Central Powers.

Battles 
Bojnik (24 February), against Bulgarians, Serbian victory
Mačkovac (26 February), against Bulgarians, Serbian victory
Kuršumlija (27 February), Serbian liberation of the town
Lebane (1 March), Serbian liberation of the town
Prokuplje (3 March), Serbian liberation of the town
Blace (5 March), against Austro-Hungarians, Serbian liberation of the town
Jankova klisura, against Austro-Hungarians, Serbian victory
Brus, against Austro-Hungarians, Serbian victory
Prokuplje (14 March), Central Power re-occupation

See also 

 Serbian Campaign (World War I)
 Bulgaria during World War I

References

Sources 

Milovanović, Kosta, and Božica Mladenović. (1998). Dnevnik Koste Milovanovića Pećanca: od 1916. do 1918. godine. Istorijski Institut SANU.

Mladenović, Božica, and Milić J. Milićević. (2011). "Казивања Радоша Николића о Топличком устанку." Мешовита грађа 32: 553–560.

Pešić, N., Turović, D. Ž., Pavlović, P., Miljković, M., Rodić, M., & Folić, M. (2006). Ustanak u Toplici i Jablanici 1917. Udruženje ratnih dobrovoljaca 1912–1918, njihovih potomaka i poštovalaca.

External links 

Bulgaria in World War I
Bulgarian occupation of Serbia during World War I
Bulgaria–Serbia relations
Chetniks
Conflicts in 1917
February 1917 events
March 1917 events
Military operations of World War I involving Austria-Hungary
Military operations of World War I involving Bulgaria
Military operations of World War I involving Serbia
Rebellions in Serbia
Serb rebellions
Serbia in World War I
1917 in Bulgaria
1917 in Serbia
20th-century rebellions